Just Can't Get Enough may refer to:

 "Just Can't Get Enough" (The Black Eyed Peas song), 2011
 "Just Can't Get Enough" (Depeche Mode song), 1981
 Just Can't Get Enough: New Wave Hits of the '80s, a compilation album